Cowichan Indian Reserve No. 1 is an Indian reserve in British Columbia, located south of the city of Duncan.

See also
Cowichan Tribes

Indian reserves in British Columbia
Cowichan Valley